This is a list of episodes of the sitcom Disney Channel UK 5-min series As the Bell Rings.

Series overview

Episode list

Season 1 (2007)

Season 2 (2008)

References

External links
 

As the Bell Rings (United Kingdom)